Jefferson Township is an inactive township in Maries County, in the U.S. state of Missouri.

Jefferson Township has the name of Thomas Jefferson, third President of the United States.

References

Townships in Missouri
Townships in Maries County, Missouri